Tüskecsarnok is a multi-purpose indoor arena in Budapest, Hungary. It is primarily used for ice sports and is the home arena of Hungarian top division ice hockey club MAC Budapest. It was opened in 2014.

External links
 Official website of the Tüskecsarnok

Indoor arenas in Hungary
Indoor ice hockey venues in Hungary